The 2018 Mayo Senior Football Championship was the 117th edition of the Mayo GAA's premier gaelic football tournament for senior clubs in County Mayo, Ireland. Sixteen teams competed with the winners going on to represent Mayo in the Connacht Senior Club Football Championship. The championship started with a group stage and progressed to a knock out stage. The winners received the Paddy Moclair Cup.

Moy Davitts returned to the top-flight for the first time since their relegation in 2010, having claimed the 2017 Intermediate Championship title with a replay victory over Kiltimagh.

Castlebar Mitchels were the defending champions for the third season running after they defeated Ballintubber in the 2017 final. Ballintubber dethroned Mitchels in the semi-final following a replay, before defeating Breaffy in the final to win their 4th title. Crossmolina, 2001 All-Ireland champions, were relegated to the intermediate grade for the 2019 season.

Team Changes

As 2017 Intermediate Champions, Moy Davitts were promoted to the Senior Championship for 2018. They took the place of Ballinrobe, who were relegated from the Senior Championship at the end of the 2017 season.

Clubs
The 2018 Championship was contested by 16 clubs: 4 of them from South Mayo, 4 from North Mayo, 4 from West Mayo, 4 from East Mayo.

Group stage
All 16 teams entered the competition at this stage. The top 2 teams in each group qualified for the quarter-finals while the bottom team of each group entered a Relegation Playoff. All teams played one home match, one away match and one match at a neutral venue. In the event of two teams finishing on the same points total, placings were decided by head-to-head record between the teams, then by scoring difference.

Group 1

Round 1

Round 2

Round 3

Group 2

Round 1

Round 2

Round 3

Group 3

Round 1

Round 2

Round 3

Group 4

Round 1

Round 2 

Round 3

Knock-Out Stage
The top two teams in each group progressed to the knock-out stage. Group winners were drawn against group runners-up, and all games were played at neutral venues.

Quarter-finals

Semi-finals

Final

Relegation Playoffs
The four teams who finished bottom of their groups entered the relegation play-offs, with the two losers of the semi-finals meeting in the relegation play-off final. All games were played at neutral venues. Crossmolina, as losers of the final, were relegated to the Intermediate Championship for 2019.

Relegation Semi-Finals

Relegation Final

Awards

Championship statistics

Miscellaneous

 Moy Davitts returned to the top-flight for the first time since 2010
 Crossmolina Deel Rovers are relegated.

Notes

References

External links

Mayo Senior Football Championship
Mayo Senior Football Championship
Mayo SFC